Evelyn Cecil, 1st Baron Rockley, GBE, PC (30 May 1865 – 1 April 1941) was a British, Conservative Party politician.

Evelyn Cecil was born in the parish of St George's, Hanover Square in the heart of London's Mayfair. Cecil was the eldest son of Lord Eustace Cecil, grandson of James Gascoyne-Cecil, 2nd Marquess of Salisbury, and cousin of both Sir Robert Cecil and Arthur Balfour.

He was educated at Eton and New College, Oxford. Cecil was Private Secretary from 1891 to 1892, to the Prime Minister, his uncle, Robert Gascoyne-Cecil, 3rd Marquess of Salisbury, during the latter's second term and during his third term from 1895 to 1902.

On 16 February 1898, Cecil had married Hon. Alicia Amherst (a garden historian and daughter of William Tyssen-Amherst, 1st Baron Amherst of Hackney) and they had three children: Robert William Evelyn, later 2nd Baron Rockley (28 February 1901– 26 January 1976), Margaret Gertrude (27 November 1898 – 26 August 1962) and Maud Katharine Alicia (21 November 1904 - 12 June 1981). 

Cecil served as a Member of Parliament from 1898 to 1929 and was appointed a Knight Grand Cross of the Order of the British Empire (GBE) in the 1922 New Year Honours. He was raised to the Peerage on 11 January 1934 as Baron Rockley, of Lytchett Heath, in the County of Dorset.

He died in 1941 in Poole aged 75.

Arms

References

External links 
 

1865 births
1941 deaths
People educated at Eton College
Alumni of New College, Oxford
Bailiffs Grand Cross of the Order of St John
Barons in the Peerage of the United Kingdom
Evelyn, Rockley
Cecil, Evelyn
Members of the Privy Council of the United Kingdom
Knights Grand Cross of the Order of the British Empire
Cecil, Evelyn
Cecil, Evelyn
Cecil, Evelyn
Cecil, Evelyn
Cecil, Evelyn
Cecil, Evelyn
Cecil, Evelyn
Cecil, Evelyn
Cecil, Evelyn
UK MPs who were granted peerages
Members of the London School Board
Barons created by George V